The women's discus throw event at the 2022 African Championships in Athletics was held on 10 June in Port Louis, Mauritius.

Results

References

2022 African Championships in Athletics
Discus throw at the African Championships in Athletics